Adrianus Eversen (13 January 1818 – 1 December 1897) was a Dutch painter.

Biography
Adrianus Eversen portrayed the typical 19th century Dutch atmosphere in his work.  As a member of Arti et Amicitiae he belonged to the society of elite artists of his time.

Eversen was a contemporary of Cornelis Springer. Both painters were students of Hendrik Gerrit ten Cate at the same time, and usually painted contemporary regional (Oud-Hollandse) cityscapes.  In his choice of subjects, Eversen allowed himself more freedom. He painted mostly imaginary cityscapes, consisting of existing and invented fragments, unlike the more faithful representations of Springer.

The everyday life of people, Dutch architecture, and the illumination effect of sunlight played a major role in his work.

One of his descendants was the painter Johannes Hendrik Eversen.

See also
 Johannes Bosboom
 Johan Jongkind
 Johannes Hermanus Koekkoek

References

External links

1818 births
1897 deaths
Painters from Amsterdam
19th-century Dutch painters
Dutch male painters
19th-century Dutch male artists